Beth Janson is a Canadian film industry executive, who was appointed as chief operating officer of the Toronto International Film Festival in April 2022. She was previously the chief executive officer of the Academy of Canadian Cinema and Television from 2016 to 2022. Originally from Montreal, Quebec, she graduated from York University.

After graduation, Janson moved to New York City, where she married an American, Bill Ohlson, in 2001. While living in New York, Janson worked as a programmer for the Tribeca Film Festival and then served as executive director of the Tribeca Film Institute from 2010 to 2015. She then joined Rent the Runway as founding director of its program to support and encourage women in starting businesses of their own.

She succeeded Helga Stephenson as chair of the Academy of Canadian Cinema and Television in June 2016. After she left the organization in 2022, she was succeeded by Tammy Frick.

References

Chief executive officers of the Academy of Canadian Cinema & Television
Canadian women in business
People from Montreal
York University alumni
Living people
Year of birth missing (living people)
Canadian women in film
Toronto International Film Festival people